Ibrahim Hassan Hadejia is a Nigerian politician, one-term Deputy Governor of Jigawa State and elected Senator for Jigawa North East Senatorial District in the February 2019 Nigerian general elections on the platform of the All Progressives Congress (APC).

Education 
Hadejia attended Sacred Heart Primary School Kaduna and Barewa College Zaria, after which he enrolled in the School of Basic Studies at Ahmadu Bello University for a year, passing the IJMB, which gave him the opportunity for direct admission in a degree course in law at the same institution in 1983. He graduated with a law degree in 1986 and went to the Law School Lagos for his B.L. qualification and subsequent call to Nigerian Bar. He also enrolled in diploma course at Oxford University, where he obtained a diploma in computing.

Career 

Hadejia did his mandatory Youth Service in Lagos and worked for a year with Credit and Finance International, a finance house as in-house counsel and company secretary.

Two years later, he joined Liberty Merchant Bank Lagos, where he worked in credit administration, banking operations and international treasury for eight years.

He was appointed Commissioner for Justice and Attorney General in Jigawa State in 1999 and promoted to secretary to the state government two years later.

He was appointed the Deputy Governor before the elections in 2003 and ran again as a Deputy Governor on the ANPP tickets a few months later and continued in that position till 2007.

From 2007 to 2014, he was engaged in private business in the insurance, construction and security consultancy sector and was also a partner in the law form of Hassan,Iman & co.

Politics 
In 2014, he was involved in the formation of the All Progressive Congress APC as a state leader of the ANPP, one of the three political parties that formed alliance and was elected Deputy Governor of Jigawa State on joint serving in that role from 2015 to 2018. He ran for and won a senate seat in 2018 and is currently the senator representing the Jigawa North East senatorial zone.

References

Jigawa State
Living people
Members of the Senate (Nigeria)
Year of birth missing (living people)